Ambrose Leevolio Reid (December 3, 1898 – April 7, 1966) was an American Negro league outfielder in the 1920s and 1930s.

A native of Eatonton, Georgia, Reid made his Negro leagues debut in 1920 with the Atlanta Black Crackers. His career spanned 13 seasons, most of which were spent with the Bacharach Giants. In 1931, Reid was having a very productive season for the Homestead Grays before joining the Pittsburgh Crawfords mid-season. He finished his career where he began, with the Atlanta Black Crackers in 1932. Reid died in Philadelphia, Pennsylvania in 1966 at age 67.

References

External links
 and Baseball-Reference Black Baseball stats and Seamheads

1898 births
1966 deaths
Atlanta Black Crackers players
Bacharach Giants players
Detroit Stars players
Hilldale Club players
Homestead Grays players
Pittsburgh Crawfords players
Baseball outfielders
Baseball players from Georgia (U.S. state)
People from Eatonton, Georgia
20th-century African-American sportspeople